Uganda Martyrs' Hospital Lubaga, commonly known as Lubaga Hospital, which was formerly named Rubaga Hospital,  is a private, not-for-profit, community hospital in Kampala, the capital city of Uganda.

Location
The hospital is located on Lubaga Hill, in Lubaga Division, in the western part of Kampala. The coordinates of Lubaga Hospital are: 0°18'15.0"N, 32°33'10.0"E (Latitude:0.304167; Longitude:32.552778).

Overview
Rubaga Hospital was started in 1899 by the Missionary Sisters of Our Lady of Africa. It is reported to be the oldest Catholic hospital in Uganda. It is owned by the Roman Catholic Archdiocese of Kampala and is accredited by the Uganda Catholic Medical Bureau (UCMB). The hospital is governed by a Board of Governors appointed by the Archbishop of Kampala. Lubaga Hospital is managed by the Hospital Administrative Team. The hospital is affiliated to UCMB. It also functions as the teaching hospital for the Lubaga Health Training Institution.

Operations
The hospital had a bed capacity of 274, as of December 2019. At that time, patient user fees accounted for 83.3 percent of the total hospital annual income, while subsidies from the government of Uganda accounted for 1.4 percent of total hospital annual income. Institutional and individual donations as well as contribution by the Roman Catholic Diocese of Kampala, cover the remaining 15.3 percent.

Lubaga Hospital attends to 164,008 outpatients annually, averaging 450 outpatients daily, Monday through Sunday, including holidays. On average, 17,850 in patients are admitted every year, leading to a bed occupancy ratio of 62.5 percent. 6,832 babies are born at the hospital every year on average, with a caesarian section rate of 25.6 percent.

See also

References

External links
 Rubaga Hospital To Fundraise for Neonatal Unit
 Lubaga Hospital belongs to the 11 biggest hospitals in Uganda in terms of workload
 Profile of Rubaga Hill

Hospitals in Kampala
Lubaga Division
Hospitals established in 1899
1899 establishments in Uganda
Teaching hospitals in Uganda
Catholic hospitals in Africa